Carolina Visca (born 31 May 2000) is an Italian female javelin thrower, born in Rome from Italian father (that is also her coach) and Colombian mother. who won several medals at youth level (Under-18, Under-20, Under-23).

In September 2018 in Pescara she established her personal best with the measure of 57.93 m, which is a new Italian U20 record.

Biography
On 10 July 2018 she qualifies for the final of the javelin throw at the 2018 IAAF World U20 Championships in Tampere, with the second best measure among the participating athletes, behind teammate Sara Zabarino. Than in final was 4th, just over a meter from the bronze medal and all the first three girls launched a measure lower than her season best. On 21 July 2019 she was qualified for the final with the second measure behind Julia Ulbricht. In the final became first yet from the second throw but in the last throw she take definitely the gold medal at European U20 championships in Borås. After only 1 week she take the U20NR with 58,47 and win the competition of Italian senior championship in Brixen.

Achievements

Personal bests
Javelin throw: 58.47 m –  Brixen, 28 July 2019

See also
 Italian all-time lists - Javelin throw

References

External links

2000 births
Living people
Italian female javelin throwers
Athletics competitors of Fiamme Gialle
Italian Athletics Championships winners